The discography of Ira Losco, a Maltese singer, contains five studio albums and forty-three singles. She represented Malta at the Eurovision Song Contest 2002 in Tallinn, Estonia with the song "7th Wonder", the song went on to finish second in the Final which was won by Marie N from Latvia with the song "I Wanna". She represented her country for the second time at Eurovision Song Contest 2016 in Stockholm, Sweden with the song "Walk on Water" and finished 11th (Ties with The Netherlands) in the grand final.

Her debut studio album, Someone Else, was released in April 2004. The album includes the singles "Love Me Or Hate Me", "Who I Am", "Someone Else", "Say Hey", "I'm In Love Again" and "Must've Been Good". Her first Remix album, Blends & Remixes of Someone Else, was released in January 2005. Her second studio album, Accident Prone, was released in November 2005. The album includes the singles "Everyday", "Get Out", "Don't Wanna Talk About It", "Driving One Of Your Cars", "Accident Prone", "Uh-Oh" and "Waking Up To The Light". Her third studio album, Unmasked, was released in December 2006. The album includes the singles "Winter Day" and "Arms Of The Ones...". Her fourth studio album, Fortune Teller, was released in June 2008. The album includes the singles "Something To Talk About", "Don't Look Down", "Idle Motion", "Promises", "Elvis Can You Hear Me?", "Shoulders of Giants", "What's The Matter With You?" and "Fortune Teller". Her second Remix album, Mixed Beats, was released in August 2009. The album includes the singles "What's The Matter With Your Cabrio", "Shoulders of Giants" and "Love Song". Her fifth studio album, The Fire, was released in March 2013. The album includes the singles "What I'd Give", "The Person I Am", "Me Luv U Long Time" and "The Way It's Meant To Be".

Albums

Studio albums

Remix albums

Compilation albums

Singles

As lead artist

Other appearances

Covers & Re-Makes
 Ira re-made the track "Say Hey" featuring aspiring singer Caroline Stapley in 2004. The track was just a radio hit and is not featured in any album or single.
 Michelle Hunziker covered the tracks "Get Out", "Love Me Or Hate Me" and "Someone Else" for her debut album "Lole" in 2006.
 "Accident Prone" was remixed by DJ Ruby, Thomas Penton & Alex Armes, but wasn't featured in any album.
 Riffs from "Uh Oh" were sampled on Kelly Clarkson's track "Don't Waste Your Time".

References

External links
 Official Website

Discographies of Maltese artists
Pop music discographies